The following is a list of São Toméan politicians, both past and present.



A
Norberto d'Alva Costa Alegre 
Armindo Vaz d'Almeida
Damião Vaz d'Almeida
Leonel Mário d'Alva
Maria do Nascimento da Graça Amorim
Carlos Gustavo dos Anjos

B
Alda Bandeira
Albertino Bragança
Raul Bragança
Joaquim Rafael Branco

C
Evaristo Carvalho
João Paulo Cassandra
José Cassandra
Celestino Rocha da Costa 
Gabriel Costa
Guilherme Posser da Costa
Manuel Pinto da Costa
Tomé Vera Cruz

D
Daniel Lima dos Santos Daio
Dionísio Tomé Dias

F
Albertino da Boa Morte Francisco

G
Carlos da Graça

M
Fradique de Menezes

N
Maria das Neves

P
Alberto Paulino
Ovídio Manuel Barbosa Pequeno
Francisco Fortunato Pires
Zeferino dos Prazeres

R
Mateus Meira Rita

S
Homero Jeronimo Salvaterra
Paulo Jorge Espirito Santo
Francisco da Silva
Maria do Carmo Silveira
Óscar Sousa

T
Maria Tebús
Maria de Jesus Trovoada dos Santos
Miguel Trovoada
Patrice Trovoada